Christopher Grabenstein is an American author. He published his first novel in 2005. Since then he has written novels for both adults and children, the latter often with frequent collaborator James Patterson. He graduated from the University of Tennessee in 1977 with a degree from the College of Communication and Information. In the 1980s he performed with the improvisational group "First Amendment Comedy".

Awards
In 2005, Grabenstein's debut novel was the first in the adult Ceepack Mysteries series, Tilt-a-Whirl, called an "entertaining debut" by The New York Times and given a Library Journal starred review. He has subsequently written more books in this series, called a "mash-up of Jersey Shore, Big Brother, and Survivor."

Grabenstein has also written many novels for children, including the Agatha and Anthony award-winning Haunted Mysteries series and the New York Times bestselling Escape from Mr. Lemoncello's Library. He has also co-authored a number of books with author James Patterson, for whom he previously worked when he was in advertising.

Grabenstein has won the Agatha Award for Best Children's/Young Adult Novel four times: for The Crossroads, The Hanging Hill, The Black Heart Crypt, and Escape From Mr. Lemoncello's Library. He has also won the Anthony Award twice, once for Best First Novel for Tilt-A-Whirl and once for Best Children's/Young Adult Novel for The Crossroads.

Bibliography

The John Ceepak Mysteries 

Tilt-a-Whirl (2005)
Mad Mouse (2006)
Whack A Mole (2007)
Hell Hole (2008)
Mind Scrambler (2009)
"Ring Toss" (A Ceepak Short Story) (2010)
Rolling Thunder (2010)
Fun House (2012)
Free Fall (2013)

Christopher Miller Holiday Thrillers 

Slay Ride (2006)
Hell for the Holidays (2007)

Anthologies 

 The Boys Go Fishing (Aug 2010) in Death's Excellent Vacation
 The Unknown Patriot (2018) in Scream and Scream Again

Books for Children

The Haunted Mysteries 

 The Crossroads (2008)
The Hanging Hill (2009) which is now The Demons Door (2017)
The Smoky Corridor (2010) which is now The Zombie Awakening (2017)
The Black Heart Crypt (2011)

Riley Mack

Riley Mack and the Other Known Troublemakers (2012)
Riley Mack Stirs Up More Trouble (2013)

Mr. Lemoncello 
 Escape from Mr. Lemoncello's Library (2013)
 Mr. Lemoncello's Library Olympics (2016)
 Mr. Lemoncello's Great Library Race (2017)
 Mr. Lemoncello's All-Star Breakout Game (2019)
 Mr. Lemoncello and the Titanium Ticket (2020)
 Mr. Lemoncello's Very First Game (2022)

Daniel X 
Daniel X: Armageddon (2012)
Daniel X: Lights Out (2015)

I Funny 
I Funny (2012)
I Even Funnier (2013)
I Totally Funniest (2015)
I Funny TV (2016)
I Funny School of Laughs (2017)

Treasure Hunters 
 Treasure Hunters (2013)
 Treasure Hunters: Danger Down the Nile (2014)
 Treasure Hunters: Secret of the Forbidden City (2015)
 Treasure Hunters: Peril at the Top of the World (2016)

House of Robots 
House of Robots (2014)
House Of Robots: Robots Go Wild (2015)
House Of Robots: Robot Revolution (2017)

Wonderland 
Welcome to Wonderland: Home Sweet Motel (2016)
Welcome to Wonderland: Beach Party Surf Monkey (2017)
Welcome to Wonderland: Sandapalooza Shake-Up (2018) with James Patterson

Jackie Ha Ha 
Jacky Ha-Ha (2016)
Jacky Ha Ha: My Life Is A Joke (2017)

Others 
The Explorer's Gate (2012)
Don't Call Me Christina Kringle (2013)
The Island of Dr. Libris (2015)
Word of Mouse (2016)
Laugh Out Loud (2017)
Pottymouth and Stoopid (2017)
Max Einstein: The Genius Experiment (2018) with James Patterson
The Smartest Kid in the Universe (2020)
The Smartest Kid in the Universe: Genius Camp (2021)

References

External links
Official website

21st-century American novelists
Living people
Writers from Buffalo, New York
American children's writers
American mystery writers
Year of birth missing (living people)
University of Tennessee alumni
Agatha Award winners
Anthony Award winners
American male novelists
21st-century American male writers
Novelists from New York (state)